Major innovations in materials technology

BC

28,000 BC – People wear beads, bracelets, and pendants
14,500 BC – First pottery, made by the Jōmon people of Japan.
6th millennium BC – Copper metallurgy is invented and copper is used for ornamentation (see Pločnik article)
2nd millennium BC – Bronze is used for weapons and armor
16th century BC – The Hittites develop crude iron metallurgy
13th century BC – Invention of steel when iron and charcoal are combined properly
10th century BC – Glass production begins in ancient Near East
1st millennium BC – Pewter beginning to be used in China and Egypt
1000 BC – The Phoenicians introduce dyes made from the purple murex.
3rd century BC – Wootz steel, the first crucible steel, is invented in ancient India
50s BC – Glassblowing techniques flourish in Phoenicia
20s BC – Roman architect Vitruvius describes low-water-content method for mixing concrete

1st millennium
3rd century – Cast iron widely used in Han Dynasty China
300 – Greek alchemist Zomius, summarizing the work of Egyptian alchemists, describes arsenic and lead acetate
4th century – Iron pillar of Delhi is the oldest surviving example of corrosion-resistant steel
8th century – Porcelain is invented in Tang Dynasty China
8th century – Tin-glazing of ceramics invented by Arabic chemists and potters in Basra, Iraq
9th century – Stonepaste ceramics invented in Iraq
900 – First systematic classification of chemical substances appears in the works attributed to Jābir ibn Ḥayyān (Latin: Geber) and in those of the Persian alchemist and physician Abū Bakr al-Rāzī ( 865–925, Latin: Rhazes)
900 – Synthesis of ammonium chloride from organic substances described in the works attributed to Jābir ibn Ḥayyān (Latin: Geber)
900 – Abū Bakr al-Rāzī describes the preparation of plaster of Paris and metallic antimony
9th century – Lustreware appears in Mesopotamia

2nd millennium
1000 – Gunpowder is developed in China
1340 – In Liège, Belgium, the first blast furnaces for the production of iron are developed
1448 – Johann Gutenberg develops type metal alloy
1450s – Cristallo, a clear soda-based glass, is invented by Angelo Barovier
1540 – Vannoccio Biringuccio publishes first systematic book on metallurgy
1556 – Georg Agricola's influential book on metallurgy
1590 – Glass lenses are developed in the Netherlands and used for the first time in microscopes and telescopes
1664 – In the pipes supplying water to the gardens at Versailles, cast iron is used

18th century
1717 – Abraham Darby makes iron with coke, a derivative of coal
1738 – Metallic zinc processed by distillation from calamine and charcoal patented by William Champion
1740  – Crucible steel technique developed by Benjamin Huntsman
1774 – 
Joseph Priestley discovers oxygen
Johann Gottlieb Gahn discovers manganese
Karl Wilhelm Scheele discovers chlorine
1779  – Hydraulic cement (stucco) patented by Bryan Higgins for use as an exterior plaster
1799  – Acid battery made from copper/zinc by Alessandro Volta

19th century
1821  – Thermocouple invented by Thomas Johann Seebeck
1824  – Portland cement patent issued to Joseph Aspdin
1825  – Metallic aluminum produced by Hans Christian Ørsted
1839  – Vulcanized rubber invented by Charles Goodyear
1839  – Silver-based photographic processes invented by Louis Daguerre and William Fox Talbot
1855  – Bessemer process for mass production of steel patented by Henry Bessemer
1861  – Color photography demonstrated by James Clerk Maxwell
1883  – First solar cells using selenium waffles made by Charles Fritts
1893  – Thermite Welding developed and soon used to weld rails

20th century
1902  – Synthetic rubies created by the Verneuil process developed by Auguste Verneuil
1908  – Cellophane invented by Jacques E. Brandenberger
1909  – Bakelite hard thermosetting plastic presented by Leo Baekeland
1911  – Superconductivity discovered by Heike Kamerlingh Onnes
1912  – Stainless steel invented by Harry Brearley
1916  – Method for growing single crystals of metals invented by Jan Czochralski
1919  – The merchant ship Fullagar has the first all welded hull. 
1924  – Pyrex invented by scientists at Corning Incorporated, a glass with a very low coefficient of thermal expansion
1931  – synthetic rubber called neoprene developed by Julius Nieuwland (see also: E.K. Bolton, Wallace Carothers)
1931  – Nylon developed by Wallace Carothers
1935  – Langmuir–Blodgett film coating of glass was developed by Katharine Burr Blodgett, creating "invisible glass" which is >99% transmissive
1938  – The process for making poly-tetrafluoroethylene, better known as Teflon discovered by Roy Plunkett
1939  – Dislocations in metals confirmed by Robert W. Cahn
1947  – First germanium point-contact transistor invented
1947  – First commercial application of a piezoelectric ceramic: barium titanate used as a phonograph pickup
1951  – Individual atoms seen for the first time using the field ion microscope
1953  – Metallic catalysts which greatly improve the strength of polyethylene polymers discovered by Karl Ziegler
1954  – Silicon solar cells with 6% efficiency made at Bell Laboratories
1954  – Argon oxygen decarburization (AOD) refining invented by scientists at the Union Carbide Corporation
1959  – Float glass process patented by the Pilkington Brothers
1962  – SQUID superconducting quantum interference device invented
1966  – Stephanie Kwolek invented a fibre that would later become known as Kevlar
1968  – Liquid crystal display developed by RCA
1970  – Silica optical fibers grown by Corning Incorporated
1980  – Duplex stainless steels developed which resist oxidation in chlorides
1984  – Fold-forming system developed by Charles Lewton-Brain to produce complex three dimensional forms rapidly from sheet metal
1985  – The first fullerene molecule discovered by scientists at Rice University (see also: Timeline of carbon nanotubes)
1986  – The first high temperature superconductor is discovered by Georg Bednorz and K. Alex Müller

See also
Timeline of scientific discoveries
Timeline of historic inventions
List of inventions named after people
Materials science
Roman metallurgy

References

Materials Technology
Materials science